"Vindaloo" is the debut single by British band Fat Les, released in 1998 and recorded for the 1998 FIFA World Cup. The music was co-written by Blur bassist Alex James and bassist Guy Pratt. The lyrics were written by comedian Keith Allen. The song was originally written as a parody of football chants, but was adopted as one in its own right and became a classic. 

The song's name comes from the vindaloo, a type of very spicy Goan curry that is popular in the United Kingdom. 
Much of the song consists of the phrase "nah nah nah" and the word "vindaloo" repeated over and over by a mixed group, occasionally interspersed with lines such as "And we all like vindaloo" and "We're England; we're gonna score one more than you". The song has brief verses, spoken/sung by Keith Allen (in a voice sounding similar to that of Ian Dury) over a marching snare drum beat. 

"Vindaloo" reached number two on the UK Singles Chart in June 1998; it was beaten to No. 1 by "3 Lions '98" by David Baddiel and Frank Skinner and Lightning Seeds, a re-release of football anthem "Three Lions" from 1996 with slightly altered lyrics.

Background
In May 1998, while discussing the forthcoming FIFA World Cup at the Groucho Club, Allen and James had the idea of creating an unofficial World Cup song. James thought that a drum beat he heard at a match at Craven Cottage would make a good football song, and they went to see Guy Pratt to write the song together, basing the melody on an established football chant. They also brought in a singer Andy Kane, and they were later joined by artist Damien Hirst when they asked him to create artwork for them. They called the band Fat Les, named after a woman they knew.

The idea of using "vindaloo" in the lyrics came when they ordered a takeaway while writing the song, but when the pizza arrived, they craved a vindaloo instead. Allen reasoned that a standard Indian dish would be apt for the type of songs a "right-wing lout" hostile to Indians would like.

The line "Me and me Mum and me Dad and me Gran" was inspired by something Allen's son Alfie Allen said. 
The line "we're off to Waterloo" references the Eurostar service which ran from that station at the time.

Music video
The music video for the song by Keith Allen is a parody of the video for "Bitter Sweet Symphony" by The Verve, which was itself inspired by the music video for "Unfinished Sympathy" by Massive Attack. The video was recorded in the same street in Hoxton, London, and features comedian Paul Kaye as a Richard Ashcroft lookalike forcing his way down the pavement along the street. 

Unlike the original video, in which Ashcroft is alone, Kaye gradually gathers a large crowd which includes Fat Les members Keith Allen, Alex James, and artist Damien Hirst, further on Rowland Rivron (as the drumming Queens guard), Edward Tudor-Pole, Matt Lucas and David Walliams (wearing Mash and Peas jumpers), comedian/actor Ricky Grover as a security guard, a group of children including Allen's young son and daughter Alfie and Lily, the late Malcolm Hardee, sumo wrestlers, French maids, a French mime artist, an Onion Johnny, Pearly Kings and Queens, a Max Wall lookalike (as Professor Wallofski), a priest, women dressed as girls from St Trinian's and many others who dance around him, some brandishing bags of curry. By the end, Kaye has joined in celebrating with the rest of the crowd.

Controversy
The song sounded a little too much like a "hooligan's anthem" for some observers, and from the point of view of the BBC (who commission the official UK Music Chart) the band were deliberately creating controversy referencing an earlier racial incident on the BBC TV programme The Late Show. Guest Keith Allen got into an extremely heated row with the panel over his view that comedy was now being hamstrung to appease rules of political correctness. Just before storming off the live broadcast, Allen stormed at an Asian member of the panel, writer Farrukh Dhondy, that "It's not a chip you've got on your shoulder, it's a fucking vindaloo!". He later attempted to explain to press reporters, claiming he used vindaloo because it is faux ethnic (this piece of Goan cuisine actually originated from Portugal), like those who he accused of being self-appointed spokespeople for ethnic minority communities' rights in order to censor arts and culture. Others have praised the song for showing the multiculturalism of England, how a Goan/Portuguese dish became a postmodern national football anthem, although most of the lyrics are fairly nonsensical or as The Guardian put it "irritating, pretentiously proletarian jape".

Track listings
UK CD1
 "Vindaloo" (radio edit)
 "Vindaloo" (laughter mix)
 "Vindaloo" (karaoke mix)

UK CD2
 "Vindaloo" (radio edit)
 "Vindaloosh" (cocktail mix)
 "Vindaloo" (extended mix)
 "Vindaloo" (video)

UK cassette single
 "Vindaloo" (radio edit)
 "Vindaloosh" (cocktail mix)
 "Vindaloo" (laughter mix)

Charts

Weekly charts

Year-end charts

Certifications

Cover versions
 In 2021, Will Mellor recorded a charity version called "Vindaloo Two" with celebrities such as Paddy McGuinness, Leigh Francis, Danny Dyer and Bez from the Happy Mondays, in order to raise money for the NHS.
 B&Q use the music (with altered lyrics) to advertise their Tradepoint concession on their in store marketing.

References

1998 songs
1998 debut singles
Fat Les songs
Football songs and chants
Songs written by Keith Allen (actor)
Songs written by Alex James (musician)
Telstar Records singles